Richard Jones Hobson (1788–1871) was an Irish Anglican priest in the 19th  century.

Hobson was born in County Cork and educated  at Trinity College, Dublin.  He was  Archdeacon of Waterford from 1825 until his resignation in 1831, after which he was Treasurer.

References

19th-century Irish Anglican priests
Archdeacons of Waterford
People from County Cork
Alumni of Trinity College Dublin
1788 births
1871 deaths